The Fraternal Society of Patriots of Both Sexes, Defenders of the Constitution was a French revolutionary organization notable in the history of feminism as an early example of active participation of women in politics.

History 

The Fraternal Society was founded in October 1790 by Claude Dansard, un maître de pension, or school master. This organization's goal was to provide a civic education that would lead to revolutionary acts becoming a daily occurrence. An original characteristic of this group was the fact that they were widely inclusive to women.
Originally, the organization's meeting place was an old library room of the disused Dominican (called "Jacobins" in France) convent on Rue Saint-Honoré, the one which hosted the revolutionary Jacobin Club. It has been suggested that the Fraternal Society grew out of the regular occupants of a special gallery allocated to women at the Jacobin Club.

Within this organization there were two secretary posts that were guaranteed to women at all times. The other positions would be divided up among the men and women members, making it much more egalitarian than previous revolutionary organizations. However the role of President was always held by a man. The women and men sat among each other and each member referred to one another as "brother" and "sister". The women possessed the same membership cards as men and were permitted to vote on matters.

The members of this organization, of which Pépin Degrouhette, Tallien and Merlin de Thionville were at one point presidents, debated the subject of liberty, France, and the Constitution with a zeal that was seen as surpassing that of the Jacobins.

The Fraternal Society lent the energy of their female members to long dull speeches of the Jacobins, which were enthusiastically cheered by vivacious female participants. who frequently rallied and energized their fellow revolutionaries. There was also a strong bond between this revolutionary club and the others who shared the same democratic views, such as the Cordeliers, with whom they would sometimes organize rallies.

Famous members 

 Etta Palm d'Aelders
 Louise-Félicité de Kéralio
 Pauline Léon
 Jacques-René Hébert
 Marie Marguerite Françoise Hébert
 Anne-Josèphe Théroigne de Méricourt
 François Robert
 Jean-Lambert Tallien
 Antoine Merlin de Thionville
 Madame Boudray

See also 
Society of Revolutionary Republican Women

Notes

References 

 Andress, David. "The Saint-Cloud Affair." Massacre at the Champ De Mars: Popular Dissent and Political Culture in the French Revolution. Suffolk, UK: Royal Historical Society, 2000. 118-19. Print.
 Aulard, F. -A., tr. Bernard Miall. "Formation of the Democratic Party." The French Revolution; a Political History, 1789–1804,. Vol. 1. New York: C. Scribner's Sons, 1910. 234. Print
 Godineau, Dominique. The Women of Paris and Their French Revolution. Berkeley: University of California, 1998. Google Books. Web. 7 Nov 2013.
 Hazan, Eric. "Chapitre IV La Constituante à Paris – Les Journées Des 5 Et 6 Octobre, Les Clubs, La Réorganisation Administrative, La Fête De La Fédération (octobre 1789juillet 1790)." Une Histoire De La Révolution Française. N.p.: La Fabrique, 2012. N. pag. Print. (In French)
 McMillan, James. "The Rights of Man and the Rights of Women, the Public Sphere Redefined." France and Women, 1789–1914: Gender, Society and Politics. London and New York: Routledge, 2000. 20. Print.

Groups of the French Revolution
1790 establishments in France
Proto-feminists
Feminism in France
Women in the French Revolution

fr:Société fraternelle de l'un et l'autre sexe